Fighting (Chinese: 英雄之战) is a 2014 Chinese action-romance film directed by Yu Junhao and starring Lu Yi, Peter Ho, Wei Yi and Zhang Zhikang. The film was released on March 21, 2014.

Cast
 Lu Yi
 Peter Ho
 Wei Yi
 Zhang Zhikang
 Hou Yong
 Wu Ma
 Yvonne Yung
 Lam Wai
 Li Shuran
 Zhang Xiaojun

References

2014 films
Chinese romantic drama films
2010s Mandarin-language films
Chinese action drama films